Fernando Francisco Reges (born 25 July 1987), known simply as Fernando, is a Brazilian professional footballer who plays for Spanish club Sevilla as a defensive midfielder.

He spent the longest spell of his career with Porto after signing in 2007, going on to appear in 237 competitive matches and win 12 major titles, including four Primeira Liga championships and the 2011 Europa League. He also played professionally in England, Turkey and Spain, winning the domestic league twice with Galatasaray, the 2016 League Cup with Manchester City and the 2020 Europa League with Sevilla.

Fernando represented Brazil at under-20 level.

Club career

Porto
Fernando was born in Alto Paraíso de Goiás. In June 2007 he signed a five-year contract with FC Porto directly from the Série C, having started his career at Vila Nova Futebol Clube. However, he spent his first year in Portugal loaned to C.F. Estrela da Amadora, where he was first choice.

In the 2008–09 season, having returned to Porto, Fernando was an ever-present midfield fixture alongside established Lucho González and Raul Meireles, as the northerners achieved a fourth consecutive Primeira Liga title. He continued to be a starter when healthy, appearing in 41 competitive games during the 2010–11 campaign (including two goals in nearly 3,000 minutes of action) as his team won the treble.

On 9 February 2014, following an extensive negotiation that inclusively saw the player being suspended, Fernando renewed his contract with Porto until 2017.

Manchester City

On 25 June 2014, Fernando completed a move to Manchester City for an undisclosed fee believed to be in the region of £12 million; upon arriving, he said: "I will give my all every time I play and I'm looking forward to many happy years in Manchester". He made his competitive debut on 10 August in the 2014 FA Community Shield, playing the full 90 minutes in a 0–3 loss against Arsenal at Wembley Stadium. He first appeared in the Premier League a week later, in a 2–0 win away to Newcastle United.

Fernando scored his first goal for City on 26 December 2014, contributing to a 3–1 away victory over West Bromwich Albion. He featured 90 minutes in the final of the League Cup on 28 February 2016, helping defeat Liverpool on penalties. On 4 May, he scored an own goal after 20 minutes of the UEFA Champions League semi-final fixture against Real Madrid at the Santiago Bernabéu Stadium – the first time the club coached by Manuel Pellegrini had reached that stage– in an eventual 1–0 loss (also on aggregate).

During his three-year spell at the City of Manchester Stadium, Fernando played 102 official matches and scored four times.

Galatasaray
On 4 August 2017, Fernando signed with Galatasaray SK on a three-year contract for an initial fee of €5.25 million; in a note published on the Turkish club's official website, it was confirmed that the payment would ascend based on the accomplishment of certain performance variables during his spell. He made his Süper Lig debut in the first fixture, playing 82 minutes in a 4–1 home defeat of Kayserispor. He made 26 competitive appearances during the season, scoring on 9 December in a 4–2 home victory against Akhisar Belediyespor and repeating the feat the following 29 April to help defeat reigning champions Beşiktaş J.K. 2–0 at home, a result which proved decisive for achieving the league title.

Sevilla
On 12 July 2019, aged 32, Fernando joined Sevilla FC of the Spanish La Liga for a fee of €4.5 million, agreeing to a deal until 30 June 2022. He made his debut on 18 August in a 2–0 win at RCD Espanyol on the first day of the season, and scored his first league goal on 23 February 2020 in a 3–0 away victory over Getafe CF; he added another on 11 June in a 2–0 win against city rivals Real Betis. He made seven appearances in the team's successful campaign in the UEFA Europa League, including the 3–2 defeat of Inter Milan in the final in Cologne.

In the final stretch of 2020–21, Fernando scored in wins at RC Celta de Vigo and Real Sociedad, as well as a draw away to Real Madrid, as Sevilla finished in fourth place. At the start of the following calendar year, with over 100 club appearances to his name, the 34-year-old added two more seasons to his contract.

International career
Fernando was in the Brazil under-20 squad at the 2007 South American Youth Championship, where he was sent off in the second round against Chile for assaulting referee Albert Duarte, as the nation went on to win the tournament in Paraguay. Subsequently, he received a one-year ban from CONMEBOL competitions for his actions and was not included for the following tournament in the category, the 2007 FIFA World Cup.

In January 2013, Fernando declared: "Even if someone asked me to naturalize, I would refuse. My dream is to play for Brazil. I'm sure one day I will wear the amarelinha". However, in December, he became a Portuguese citizen, applying to FIFA in March 2014 to change his international allegiance to Portugal. Despite this, under article 8.1 of the governing body's statutes, he was only eligible to represent Brazil internationally as he previously played for that country at under-20 level and did not hold Portuguese citizenship at that time.

Career statistics

Club

Honours
Vila Nova
Campeonato Goiano: 2005

Porto
Primeira Liga: 2008–09, 2010–11, 2011–12, 2012–13
Taça de Portugal: 2008–09, 2009–10, 2010–11
Supertaça Cândido de Oliveira: 2009, 2010, 2012, 2013
UEFA Europa League: 2010–11

Manchester City
Football League Cup: 2015–16

Galatasaray
Süper Lig: 2017–18, 2018–19
Turkish Cup: 2018–19

Sevilla
UEFA Europa League: 2019–20

Brazil U20
South American Youth Championship: 2007

Individual
La Liga Player of the Month: April 2021

References

External links

Sevilla official profile

1987 births
Living people
Portuguese people of Brazilian descent
Naturalised citizens of Portugal
Sportspeople from Goiás
Brazilian footballers
Association football midfielders
Campeonato Brasileiro Série B players
Campeonato Brasileiro Série C players
Vila Nova Futebol Clube players
Primeira Liga players
FC Porto players
C.F. Estrela da Amadora players
Premier League players
Manchester City F.C. players
Süper Lig players
Galatasaray S.K. footballers
La Liga players
Sevilla FC players
UEFA Europa League winning players
Brazil under-20 international footballers
Brazilian expatriate footballers
Expatriate footballers in Portugal
Expatriate footballers in England
Expatriate footballers in Turkey
Expatriate footballers in Spain
Brazilian expatriate sportspeople in Portugal
Brazilian expatriate sportspeople in England
Brazilian expatriate sportspeople in Turkey
Brazilian expatriate sportspeople in Spain